The Bakhuis Mountains are a mountain range in central Suriname, spanning 110 kilometres. The mountain range form of the Northern part of the Wilhelmina Mountains, and the mountains and its village were named after the Dutch explorer and Royal Dutch East Indies Army officer . It is situated in the Sipaliwini Savanna District of Suriname. The Bakhuys Airstrip is nearby the village.

The Bakhuis Mountains have rich deposits of bauxite, as well as nickel and copper. In 1974, a new mineral named  ((Mg, Fe2+)3Al4BeSi3O16) was found in the mountain range. The Bakhuis mountain range is an area  of 2800 km² and contains a large concession area for mining bauxite, in which both the Surinamese company  and foreign exploitation companies are interested. Ecologists fear destruction of jungle area when the mining commences.

In the second half of the 20th century there was already a plan to economically exploit the area: the West Suriname Plan, centered on the mining of bauxite in the Bakhuis Mountains. After Suriname became independent of the Netherlands in the 1980s, however, the implementation of this plan was discontinued. A specially built railway line was built in 1972, connecting the Bakhuis Mountains with Apoera, however the railway line was never put into use and was abandoned in 2002.

References

Mountain ranges of Suriname